James Contiez, better known as Contiez, is a Melbourne-based Australian DJ and music producer in the House/Trap/Dance genres. He is best known for his single "Trumpsta" featuring Treyy G which peaked at number 3 in Sweden and achieved top 20 in Denmark, Finland and Norway.

Discography

Singles

Others
23 April 2012: Access EP [Preston Recordings]
15 May 2012: Rock It EP [Club Cartel Records]
21 May 2012: "Paradiso" [Vinyl Pusher]
6 August 2012: "E=3" [Vinyl Pusher]
20 August 2012: Freakin' (Remixes) (Safari Weapons 5) [Safari Music]
29 August 2012: More Than Just a Martian EP [Preston Recordings]
6 December 2012: I'm a Trumpsta EP [PhetHouse Records]
29 April 2013: Trumpsta Remixes (feat. Treyy G) [Safari Music]
3 June 2013: "Don't Bother" [hi-tech Records]
1 July 2013: "Lady Funk" (with Treyy G) [Shabang Records]
22 July 2013: Time Wasters EP [Hype Recordings]

References

Australian DJs
Australian record producers
People from Melbourne
Living people
Year of birth missing (living people)